EliteXC: Primetime was a mixed martial arts event promoted by  Elite Xtreme Combat  taking place on May 31, 2008 at the Prudential Center in Newark, New Jersey.

Background
In February 2008, it was announced that EliteXC had reached an agreement with CBS to broadcast live shows on Saturday nights.  This marked the first show of the agreement.  The main card aired live on CBS, marking the first time a MMA event aired in primetime on major American network television.

As with earlier EliteXC events, the preliminary card aired for free online at Proelite.com.

Results

Television ratings and coverage
In terms of ratings, the show averaged 4.85 million viewers and peaked during the main event at 6.51 million viewers, making it the most watched MMA show in television history until UFC on Fox: Velasquez vs. Dos Santos.

However, not all CBS stations carried the program at the scheduled time.  At least five – WBNS-TV in Columbus, Ohio, KXJB-TV in Fargo, North Dakota and three stations in Montana – aired a telethon to benefit the Children's Miracle Network instead.  All those stations aired the EliteXC card early the next morning.  Also, WFMY-TV in Greensboro, North Carolina and the surrounding Triad area refused to air the program because they disliked the sport – it was passed on to a low-powered independent station, WGSR-LP.

See also 
 Elite Xtreme Combat
 2008 in Elite Xtreme Combat

References

External links
Official EliteXC site
EliteXC: Primetime results at Sherdog

Primetime
2008 in mixed martial arts
Mixed martial arts in New Jersey
Sports in Newark, New Jersey
2008 in sports in New Jersey
CBS Sports
Events in Newark, New Jersey